Gianni Giardinelli (born 28 August 1979) is a French actor and model.

Filmography

References

External links
 

1979 births
Living people
French male film actors
French male television actors
21st-century French male actors
Male actors from Paris